The 2005 PharmAssist Players' Championship was held March 23-27 at the Mile One Centre in St. John's, Newfoundland and Labrador. It would be the final Championship featuring just a men's event.

The total purse for the event was $150,000 with $50,000 going to the winning team, which would be Kevin Martin's Edmonton rink. He defeated the hometown rink of Brad Gushue, whose team earned $30,000.

Draw

Pool A

Pool B

Pool C

Tie breakers
 Ralph Stöckli 6-5  Pat Ryan
 Pete Fenson 7-6  Jeff Stoughton
 Jeff Stoughton 6-2  Pat Ryan

Playoffs

External links
CurlingZone - 2005 PharmAssist Players Championships

Players Championship, 2005
Sport in St. John's, Newfoundland and Labrador
Curling in Newfoundland and Labrador
Players' Championship